Novotaymasovo (Yañı Taymaś) is a rural locality (a selo) in Taymasovsky Selsoviet, Kuyurgazinsky District, Bashkortostan, Russia. The population was 579 as of 2010. There are 5 streets.

Geography 
Novotaymasovo is located 35 km northwest of Yermolayevo (the district's administrative centre) by road. Taymasovo is the nearest rural locality.

References 

Rural localities in Kuyurgazinsky District